D. Selvaraj was an Indian politician and was a Member of the Legislative Assembly. He was elected to the Tamil Nadu legislative assembly as a Dravida Munnetra Kazhagam (DMK) candidate from Udumalpet constituency in the 1996 election. He lost the seat in the 2001 elections, when he was beaten by C. Shanmugavelu of the All India Anna Dravida Munnetra Kazhagam, the same person whom Sevaraj had beaten in 1996.

References 

Year of birth missing
Possibly living people
Dravida Munnetra Kazhagam politicians
Tamil Nadu MLAs 1996–2001